Mike Brogan was a pseudonym used by successful children's comic strip author Fred Baker  (d.2008). He wrote 10 novels between 1977 and 1979 published in the UK by Corgi Carousel (Originally by Aiden Ellis Publishing Ltd) featuring Action Man and his American friend G.I. Joe. Illustrations were by Mike Codd.

Bibliography
The Action Man novels are:

Snow Ice and Bullets - (July 1977) 
Hold the Bridge - (July 1977)  
The Taking of Monte Carrillo - (July 1977) 
Operation Skydrop - (July 1977) 
The Tough Way Out - (November 1977) 
Counter Attack! - (November 1977) 
The Spy Trap - (April 1978) 
Raid on Shuando - (May 1978)  
 Not a Chance! - (March 1979)  
Abandon Ship! - (March 1979)

Notes

References
Action Man the Official Dossier compiled by Ian Harrison (2003) 

British children's writers
Year of birth missing
2008 deaths